HMAS Bonthorpe was an auxiliary minesweeper operated by the Royal Australian Navy during World War II. She was launched in 1917 by Collingwood Shipbuilding Company at Collingwood, Ontario, Canada. Bonthorpe was owned and operated by Albany Tug Company. On 5 February 1940, Bonthorpe was requisitioned by the RAN for use as an auxiliary. She was decommissioned on 17 February 1945 and was reconverted to a trawler before becoming stranded at Cairns Inlet, Queensland in 1959.

Operational history

Bonthorpe was purchased by the Western Australian Trawling Company and sailed from Fleetwood, England to Sydney, Australia. She was later bought by the Albany Tug Company and converted into a tug based at Fremantle, Western Australia.

During the war, Bonthorpe was based in Fremantle and operated along the Western Australia coastline. She was decommissioned on 17 February 1945, and was laid up at Careening Bay, Garden Island, as part of the Reserve Fleet before being sold in 1947-48.

The ship was converted for use as a trawler. On 3 October 1950, Bonthorpe was damaged after being hit by Cooramba, when the latter broke from her mooring during a  gale. She was later sold to M. Bern & Co in 1954. In 1959, she became stranded at Cairns Inlet, Queensland.

Citations

References
 http://www.navyhistory.org.au/category/navy-day-by-day/1939/page/2/
 http://www.navy.gov.au/hmas-bonthorpe

1917 ships
Minesweepers of the Royal Australian Navy
Fishing ships of Australia